The 1893 Sewanee Tigers football team represented the Sewanee Tigers of Sewanee: The University of the South in the 1893 college football season.

Schedule

References

Sewanee
Sewanee Tigers football seasons
Sewanee Tigers football